The rough-head whiptail or oblique banded rattail, Coelorinchus aspercephalus, is a species of rattail found around New Zealand including islands to New Zealand's south, at depths of between 30 and 300 m.  Its length is between 15 and 35 cm.

References
 
 Tony Ayling & Geoffrey Cox, Collins Guide to the Sea Fishes of New Zealand,  (William Collins Publishers Ltd, Auckland, New Zealand 1982) 

Macrouridae
Endemic marine fish of New Zealand
Fish described in 1911